Smith Media, LLC,  successor to Smith Television aka Sunrise Television, was a broadcasting group co-based in Los Angeles, California and St. Petersburg, Florida, that formerly owned and operated several television stations across the United States. In 1986, it bought the three smaller television stations from publishing company Times Mirror Company. In 2002, Sunrise sold six of the stations to LIN Television.

Smith Television became Smith Media, LLC in 2004 at the death of Bob Smith, head of the family run organization. The family decided to re-capitalize their stations and sold the stations to Boston Ventures, which created Smith Media.   The similarities in names have created much confusion.

During the early 2010s, Smith Media sold off its stations; on October 1, 2013, Smith Media reached a deal to sell its last remaining station, WKTV in Utica, New York, to Heartland Media, a company owned by former Gray Television executive Bob Prather, pending FCC approval.  The sale was completed on March 20, 2014.

Formerly-owned Stations 
Stations are arranged alphabetically by state and by city of license.

 With the exception of KATN, KEYT, KJUD, KYUR, WFFF, & WKTV, the second incarnation of Smith Media never owned these stations. Smith Media, LLC was successor to Smith Television, Inc. who owned the following:

Notes:
1 Acquired along with KSBW but divested almost immediately due to Smith's ownership of KEYT.
2 Operated on channel 8 under Smith's ownership. 
3 From 2000-2004, The Ackerley Group, and later Clear Channel Communications would operate this station through a local marketing agreement (LMA). 
4 Operated on channel 25 until 2001. 
5 From 2001 to 2002, United Communications operated the station under a LMA.
6 From 1998 to 1999, Smith operated WFFF through an LMA, until Smith bought it outright in 1999.
7 Owned by Lambert Broadcasting, Smith operated WVNY through an LMA.

References

External links
 Smith Media via Boston Ventures site
 Smith Media

Defunct television broadcasting companies of the United States
Mass media companies disestablished in 2014
Companies disestablished in 2014
Companies based in St. Petersburg, Florida
Companies based in Los Angeles